Yap Goan Ho (died 1894) was a Chinese Indonesian translator, businessman, bookseller, and publisher based in Batavia, Dutch East Indies. In the 1880s and 1890s, he was one of the first Chinese Indonesians to own a printing press and the first to publish Chinese language novels in Malay language translations.

Biography
Yap was born in Batavia, Dutch East Indies in the nineteenth century, although the exact date is unknown.

Before entering into the printing business, he apparently made his money with a business selling pork. Around 1883 he acquired a printing press and started to get contracts to print books for schools and government offices. In the 1880s, he turned to the popular market and began to publish Chinese novels in illustrated Malay translations, which became very popular among the Peranakan who spoke Malay as their first language and often could not read Chinese. He may have been the first publisher to do so, and was followed not long after by Lie Kim Hok. His most popular translation was The Travels of Emperor QianLong in South China (1883). He also continued to publish educational, reference, and religious books, and even published Malay books in the Jawi script.

In June 1888 he launched a Malay-language newspaper  in Batavia, with himself as publisher and an Indo man named W. Meulenhoff as editor. Meulenhoff had previously worked as a government clerk and at the newspaper Pembrita Betawi. , a four-page paper, was distributed in cities around Java and Sumatra; it had a mostly Chinese readership and was published until around 1898.

In October 1891 Yap was embroiled in legal troubles around his press and publications; the police temporarily closed his operation and impounded his materials over accusations of stolen papers from the national printing house which were found in his offices. Yap had a contract to print for the government printing house, which is how he had come into possession of them. He also tried to found a second newspaper in 1894, but it was not successful and quickly closed.

In around 1893 he announced plans to open a new publishing house in Semarang, Central Java. Some historians believe it never actually opened. Although some sources state that he died in 1904, contemporary obituaries seem to confirm that Yap actually died in 1894.

Yap's companies continued to operate in his name after he died, and in 1897 announced the importing of workers from China to work for the Semarang branch of the business. In 1901 Yap's company went bankrupt and was forced to sell off assets in Batavia and Semarang. One of the printing presses was bought and shipped to Surakarta for a new Chinese press there, while Kho Tjeng Bie took over the part of the business that printed translated Chinese novels in Batavia.

Selected works
  (1883, Translation of the novel )
  (1883, Translation of )
  (1890)
  (1893, translation from Chinese short story collection)

  (24 volumes, 1895-1902, Boen Sing Hoo's translation of Journey to the West published by Yap)
  (1899)

References

19th-century Dutch East Indies people
Year of birth unknown
Indonesian people of Chinese descent
1894 deaths
Indonesian translators
Booksellers (people)
Publishers (people)
Chinese newspaper people
Chinese printers
Journalists from the Dutch East Indies